Uwe Potteck (born 1 May 1955) is a German sports shooter and Olympic champion. He won gold medal in the 50 metre pistol at the 1976 Summer Olympics in Montréal. At the Olympics in 1980 he placed 16th, and in 1988 he placed ninth.  His brother, Jens Potteck, is also an Olympic shooter.

References

External links
 

1955 births
Living people
German male sport shooters
Olympic shooters of East Germany
Olympic gold medalists for East Germany
Olympic medalists in shooting
Medalists at the 1976 Summer Olympics
Shooters at the 1976 Summer Olympics
Shooters at the 1980 Summer Olympics
Shooters at the 1988 Summer Olympics
National People's Army military athletes
People from Wittenberge
Sportspeople from Brandenburg
20th-century German people
21st-century German people